Tara Betts is the author of two full-length poetry collections: Break the Habit, which was published in October 2016 with Trio House Press, and her debut collection Arc & Hue on the Willow Books imprint of Aquarius Press. In 2010, Essence Magazine named her as one of their "40 Favorite Poets".

Betts was born in Kankakee, Illinois, and is the oldest of three siblings. Her first job was at the Kankakee Public Library. Betts received her B.A. in communication at Loyola University, Chicago. She received her M.F.A. in creative writing from New England College in 2007.

Betts worked with several non-profit organizations in Chicago, Illinois, including Gallery 37 and Young Chicago Authors. She received her Ph.D. in English/creative writing at Binghamton University in 2014.

Career
After earning her Ph.D., Betts returned to Chicago and began her post as a visiting lecturer at University of Illinois-Chicago in 2015. Prior to that, she was a lecturer in creative writing at Rutgers University in New Brunswick, New Jersey, until 2011. A Cave Canem graduate, and residencies from Ragdale Foundation, Centrum and Caldera, and an Illinois Arts Council Artist fellowship. Betts has self-published small runs of several chapbooks: "Can I Hang?" (1999), "Switch" (2003), "Break the Habit" (2012), and "Circling Unexpectedly" (2013). Her most recent chapbook 7 x 7: kwansabas was published by Backbone Press in 2015. Betts is also a co-editor of The Beiging of America: Personal Narratives About Being Mixed Race in the Twenty-First Century (2 Leaf Press, 2017) with Cathy Schlund-Vials and Sean Patrick Forbes.

She is working on a third collection of poetry, a collection of critical essays, and a translation of poems by Salomé Ureña de Henríquez.  Betts was commissioned by the Peggy Choy Dance Company to write a series of poems and monologues for "THE GREATEST!: An Homage to Muhammad Ali" in 2011 & 2013.  These writings were published on Winged City Press in April 2013 and were mentioned in the New York Times.

Betts' work has appeared in Essence, the Steppenwolf Theater production Words on Fire, Obsidian III, Callaloo, PMS, Meridians, Drum Voices Revue, WSQ, Columbia Poetry Review, Ninth Letter, Hanging Loose, Drunken Boat, Mythium, Reverie, and WombPoetry. Her work has been anthologized in Gathering Ground (University of Michigan Press), Bum Rush the Page (Three Rivers Press), Power Lines (Tia Chucha Press), Poetry Slam (Manic D Press), Black Writing from Chicago (Southern Illinois University Press), ROLE CALL (Third World Press), These Hands I Know (Sarabande), Best Black Women’s Erotica 2 (Cleis Press), Hurricane Blues (Southeast Missouri University Press), Home Girls Make Some Noise: Hip Hop Feminism (Parker Publishing), Fingernails Across a Chalkboard (Third World Press) and Letters to the World (Red Hen Press).

She appeared on HBO's Def Poetry Jam  and in the Black Family Channel series SPOKEN with Jessica Care Moore. She has also been one of the writers/performers in girlstory-an intergenerational, multicultural women's performance collective. Betts has also performed in plays, including two SouthWest V-Day productions of Eve Ensler's Vagina Monologues at Chicago's DuSable Museum. After winning Guild Complex's Gwendolyn Brooks Open Mic Award, she represented Chicago twice at the National Poetry Slam in 1999 and 2000.

Betts has also been a freelance writer for publications including XXL, The Source, BIBR, Mosaic Magazine and Black Radio Exclusive. She has written fictional blog posts  in the voice of character named Madeline "Maddy" James for "Any Resemblance"-a multimedia dance show with serial webisodes in June 2013.

Published works
Full-length poetry collections
Break the Habit (Trio House Press, 2016).
Arc and Hue (Willow Books, 2009).

In Anthology
 "Nothing From Nobody," That Takes Ovaries!: Bold Females and Their Brazen Acts, (Three Rivers Press, 2002).
 Rhythm of Structure: Mathematics Art and Poetic Reflection, Selby Gallery, Ringling College of Art and Design, 2011.
Near Kin: A Collection of Words and Art Inspired by Octavia Estelle Butler (Sybaritic Press, 2014).
Octavia's Brood: Science Fiction Stories from Social Justice Movements (AK Press, 2015).
 The BreakBeat Poets: New American Poetry in the Age of Hip-Hop (Haymarket Books, 2015).
Ghost Fishing: An Eco-Justice Poetry Anthology (University of Georgia Press, 2018).

References

External links
Reviews
The Poetry Foundation's 2016 Staff Picks 
Rain Taxi, Winter 2016 
NewCity Lit, December 2016 
Calyx, Vol. 26:1, Summer 2010 
Poetry Foundation's Harriet blog review of Arc and Hue
Meridian, Issue 24, 2010 
Feminist Review 
 Defenders Online  
Interviews
The Rumpus 
South Side Weekly 
 AMP 
 Speaking of Marvels 
 Live Unchained 
Split This Rock Interview with Tara Betts
 GirlSpeak 
 La Bloga 
Audio/Video Links
Poems on WNYC
“Chicago Amplified” on WBEZ Chicago Public Radio
Tara Betts on “The Blood-Jet Writing Hour” with Rachelle Cruz
Tara Betts on The SlowDown: 794: High Fidelity | The Slowdown (slowdownshow.org)

Living people
African-American poets
American women poets
New England College alumni
21st-century American poets
21st-century American women writers
Year of birth missing (living people)
21st-century African-American women writers
21st-century African-American writers